Vítor Augusto da Veiga Guilhar (12 October 1913 in São Tomé – ??) was a Portuguese footballer who played as defender.

External links 
 
 
 

1913 births
Portuguese footballers
Association football defenders
Primeira Liga players
Boavista F.C. players
FC Porto players
Portugal international footballers
Year of death missing
People from São Tomé